Trevor Deeley is a former Motorcycle Racer and Yamaha distributor. He was inducted into the Canadian Motorsport Hall of Fame in 1995.

References

Living people
Canadian motorcycle racers
Year of birth missing (living people)
Place of birth missing (living people)